The .41 Action Express is a pistol cartridge developed in 1986 to reproduce the performance of the .41 Magnum police load (which is a reduced load) in semi-automatic pistols.

History
The .41 Action Express was designed by Evan Whildin, vice president of Action Arms, in 1986. It was based on the .41 Magnum case, cut down to fit in a 9×19mm Parabellum frame, and using a rebated rim. Performance was compared to the ballistics of the 41 Magnum police load. The .41 AE was thought to be a very attractive concept, as the rebated rim allows a simple change of  barrel, mainspring, and magazine to convert many 9mm guns to 41 AE.

The powerful 10mm Auto cartridge, which had been suffering from poor acceptance from its start in the early 1980s, was eventually accepted by the FBI in a reduced power, subsonic loading. Smith & Wesson then decided the 10mm Auto was too much cartridge for the reduced power loading, and that the .45 ACP sized guns that chambered it were too heavy and bulky; out of this came the .40 S&W, a shortened 10mm Auto case, designed to fit in a 9mm-sized gun, with a reduced pressure loading that allowed a lighter, easier to shoot gun. Because most ammunition manufacturers backed the .40 S&W, there was little use for the very similar .41 AE, so production of both firearms and ammunition was soon phased out; it was designated as an 'inactive' cartridge by SAAMI in January 2005.

The .41 AE was doomed by circumstance to obscurity, but the concept of using a rebated rim to allow easy cartridge interchangeability was not lost.  The .50 Action Express, developed by Magnum Research for the Desert Eagle pistol, uses a similar rebated rim that is the same diameter as the .44 Magnum. This allows a caliber change with replacement of just the barrel and magazine.

Ballistics
The .41 AE can be ballistically similar to the .40 S&W, to the point that many reloading manuals suggest using .40 S&W load data in the .41 AE. Original IMI factory cartridges are much higher powered, pushing a 170 gr (11.02 g) bullet at 1215 ft/s. The .41AE actually outperforms the .40SW by a significant amount. Current (April 2018) production cartridges from Reed's Ammunition and Research lists the following:170 grain JHP at 1230fps; 185 grain JHP at 1180fps and 210 grain JHP at 1150fps. Old Speer reloading manuals also list 210gn JHP at 1150fps. The .40 S&W will NOT duplicate this performance. The .41 AE uses  bullets, whereas the .40 S&W uses  bullets. However, as it lacks the backing of ammunition manufacturers in making .410 caliber bullets suited to semiautomatic pistols, the .41 AE has not achieved widespread popularity.

Usage in firearms
There have been several firearms chambered for this cartridge, most notably the Israeli Uzi and the Jericho 941. The potential for success for the .41 AE was sound, and for this reason, other manufacturers offered firearms chambered at the factory for this round. Additionally, aftermarket conversion kits were available as well.

Factory chambered
Uzi Carbines and pistols
Jericho 941/Baby Eagle Early imports had the ability to switch calibers from 9mm, 41AE and .45ACP through kits that had magazines and whole slide assemblies that were marked for each respective cartridge.
TZ-75
Taurus PT92
Beretta Cougar

Aftermarket conversion
Colt M1911
Browning Hi-Power this was only offered for the MK-I series.

Variants
In 1988, IMI also developed a 9 mm Action Express, which was a .41 AE necked down to 9 mm. It offered a much larger case capacity than the standard 9 mm case, allowing velocities that matched that of the .357 Magnum when loaded with light bullets. This move anticipated the parallel development of the .357 SIG from the .40 S&W in 1994.

See also
 Table of handgun and rifle cartridges

References

External links 
 Taffin Tests the .41 Action Express
 Description of the .41 AE
 Description of the 9 mm AE

 
Pistol and rifle cartridges
Magnum pistol cartridges
Action Express cartridges
Weapons and ammunition introduced in 1986